Patrick Calhoun (March 21, 1856 – June 16, 1943) was the grandson of John C. Calhoun and Floride Calhoun, and the great-grandson of his namesake Patrick Calhoun. He is best known as a railroad baron of the late 19th century, and as the founder of Euclid Heights, Ohio.

Life and career
Patrick Calhoun was born at Fort Hill, the estate of his grandfather, John C. Calhoun, located near Clemson, South Carolina. He was born to Andrew Pickens Calhoun and Margaret Maria ( Green), and was the youngest of six children. His maternal grandfather, Duff Green, was an important South Carolina businessman who had been a financial backer of John C. Calhoun early in Calhoun's political career.

Patrick received his education in local country schools around Clemson. His life changed dramatically in 1865. The defeat of the Confederacy left Andrew P. Calhoun, a wealthy cotton planter, financially ruined. Andrew died suddenly on March 16, 1865. Patrick spent the next five years working on his family farm at Fort Hill and reading extensively in his father's library.

Patrick left home in 1871 and traveled to Dalton, Georgia, and the home of his grandfather, Duff Green. A relative defrayed the cost of his single year of high school education. He studied law thereafter under his grandfather's tutelage, and was admitted to the State Bar Association of Georgia. He moved the following year to St. Louis, Missouri, and was admitted to the Missouri bar. He suffered a severe health breakdown after a year, and went to live on the Arkansas farm of his brother, John C. Calhoun II. An attorney from Atlanta, Georgia, offered him a partnership in 1878 if he would move to Atlanta. This association was very brief, and he founded the law firm of Calhoun, King & Spalding. Focusing on corporate law, the firm became highly profitable. Calhoun used his profits to found the Calhoun Land Company (which invested in cotton production in the Mississippi Valley); buy extensive real estate in Georgia, South Carolina, and Texas; and invest or buy stock in manufacturing, mining, oil, and railroads.

In 1884, Calhoun was appointed legal counsel of the Central Rail Road and Banking Company of Georgia. He formed a syndicate of investors in 1886 and won control of the Richmond and West Point Terminal Railway and Warehouse Company. He was ousted by a similar corporate coup in 1893, but the company went bankrupt two years later and Calhoun acted as an agent for J. P. Morgan in buying the railroad and integrating it into the Southern Railway.

Highly interested in finance after this experience, Calhoun left his law practice in 1896 and became a business financier. His primary backers were the investment banks of Alex. Brown & Sons, Brown Bros. & Co., and the Maryland Trust Company. He invested heavily in street railways, directing or reorganizing systems in Baltimore, Maryland; Philadelphia, Pennsylvania; and St. Louis, Missouri. Calhoun moved to Cleveland, Ohio, in 1896. Calhoun had purchased  of wooded land atop the heights east of the city in 1890. He now began development of that land into a new planned community for the wealthy and upper classes, and named it Euclid Heights.

In 1900, Calhoun left Euclid Heights and moved to San Francisco, California. He merged the street railways of that city into a single firm, the United Railroads of San Francisco (URR), and became the company president in 1906. He then gave local political boss Abe Ruef $200,000 ($ in  dollars) to allow him to build overhead electric wires to supply his streetcars with power. Calhoun was indicted and placed on trial several times, but eventually charges against him were dismissed when his political supporters won office.

Calhoun's personal financial situation deteriorated significantly and swiftly after 1906. He claimed he lost $2.5 million ($ in  dollars) in the 1906 San Francisco earthquake, and that he'd been ruined by adverse publicity. He also spent heavily on strikebreakers in a 1907 streetcar strike, and incurred significant legal expenses fighting the streetcar workers' union. In 1912, an investigation by the California Railway Commission found that Calhoun had concealed a $1.2 million ($ in  dollars) loss in his San Francisco company in order to keep the stock price high. His investors forced him to resign the presidency of the United Railways of San Francisco in the summer of 1913.

Now 59 years old, Calhoun largely retired from business. He invested in real estate, but all his efforts failed. He moved to New York City in 1914, where he lived off his wife's income and attempted to re-establish himself in business. In 1916, he was sued for failure to pay rent on his office, and the poor state of his financial affairs was exposed. He declared bankruptcy the same year. Although some sources claim he returned to Southern California in the 1930s and regained a portion of his fortune investing in oil fields, other sources say there's little evidence to suggest he made these investments or restored his fortune and that he died instead in obscurity.

Personal life and death
Calhoun married Sarah Porter Williams on November 4, 1885. The couple had eight children: Martha, Margaret, Patrick, George, John, Andrew, Mildred, and Sarah.

After Sarah Calhoun died in August 1928, Calhoun lived with his son, John C. Calhoun, Jr. at 2036 San Pasqual Street in Pasadena, California. On June 16, 1943, he was struck in front of his home by a teenager street racing with another car. One of his legs was amputated in the accident, and he suffered severe head trauma.

He died at Huntington Memorial Hospital a few hours later. His funeral was held June 19 in the chapel of the Turner & Stevens Funeral Home. He was interred in the Calhoun family plot at Woodland Cemetery in Clemson, South Carolina.

References

Bibliography

External links
Clemson World Online -- Clemson University Alumni Magazine at cworld.clemson.edu
 

1856 births
1943 deaths
20th-century American railroad executives
Businesspeople from San Francisco
Calhoun family
American people of Scotch-Irish descent
Road incident deaths in California
Pedestrian road incident deaths